Mehmed Pasha or Mehmet Pasha may refer to:

 Ayas Mehmed Pasha (1483–1539), Ottoman grand vizier
 Baltaci Mehmed Pasha (1662–1712), Ottoman grand vizier
 Bıyıklı Mehmed Pasha (died 1521), Ottoman vizier and east front commander
 Boynuyaralı Mehmed Pasha (died 1665), Ottoman grand vizier
 Çerkes Mehmed Pasha (fl. 1624–1625), Ottoman grand vizier
 Cerrah Mehmed Pasha (fl. 1598–1599), Ottoman grand vizier
 Damat Mehmet Ali Pasha (1813–1868), Ottoman grand vizier
 Dervish Mehmed Pasha (disambiguation)
 Elmas Mehmed Pasha (1661–1697), Ottoman grand vizier
 Emin Pasha (1840–1892), also known as Mehmet Emin Pasha, German physician who entered Ottoman service
 Emir Mehmed Pasha (fl. 1589–1600), Ottoman defterdar, governor of Egypt (1596–1598) and of Damascus (1599–1600)
 Gürcü Mehmed Pasha (died 1665), Ottoman grand vizier
 Hadım Mehmed Pasha (fl. 1622–1623), Ottoman grand vizier
 Haseki Mehmed Pasha (fl. 1648–1661), Ottoman governor of Egypt, Damascus, Baghdad, and Aleppo
 Koca Hüsrev Mehmed Pasha (1769–1855), Ottoman grand vizier and admiral
 İvaz Mehmed Pasha (died 1743), Ottoman grand vizier
 Izzet Mehmed Pasha (disambiguation)
 Kadri Pasha (1832–1884), Ottoman grand vizier
 Kâmil Pasha (1833–1913), Ottoman grand vizier
 Kara Mehmed Pasha (died 1619), Ottoman grand vizier and governor of Egypt, also known as Öküz Mehmed Pasha
 Kara Mehmed Pasha (died 1722), Ottoman governor of various provinces, including Egypt
 Karamani Mehmed Pasha (fl. 1477–1481), Ottoman grand vizier
 Kavalalı Mehmed Ali Pasha (1769–1849), better known as Muhammad Ali of Egypt
 Kıbrıslı Mehmed Emin Pasha (1813–1871), Ottoman grand vizier
 Koca Mehmed Nizamüddin Pasha (fl. 1429–1439), Ottoman grand vizier
 Köprülü Mehmed Pasha (1575–1661), Albanian Ottoman grand vizier
 Kurd Mehmed Pasha (died 1605), Ottoman governor of Egypt (1594/1595–1596) and of Aleppo
 Lala Mehmed Pasha (died 1595), Ottoman grand vizier
 Mehmet Pasha (mayor of Salonica), mayor of Ottoman Salonica in 1874
 Mehmed Ali Pasha (disambiguation)
 Mehmed Ali Pasha (marshal) (1827–1878), German-born Ottoman soldier
 Mehmed Emin Pasha (disambiguation)
 Mehmed Emin Âli Pasha (1815–1871), Ottoman grand vizier
 Mehmed Emin Rauf Pasha (1780–1859), Ottoman grand vizier
 Mehmed Fuad Pasha (1815–1869), Ottoman grand vizier
 Mehmed Ferid Pasha (1851–1914), Ottoman grand vizier
 Mehmed Hâdî Pasha (1861–1932), Ottoman general and statesman
 Mehmed Hasib Pasha (died 1870), Ottoman statesman 
 Mehmed Necib Pasha (died 1851), Ottoman governor of Baghdad
 Mehmed Namık Pasha (1804–1892), Ottoman statesman
 Mehmed Riza Pasha (1809–1877), Ottoman military officer
 Mehmed Rushdi Pasha (1811–1882), Ottoman grand vizier
 Mehmed Sadık Pasha (1825–1901), Ottoman grand vizier
 Mehmed Said Pasha (1830–1914), Ottoman grand vizier
 Mehmed Şakir Pasha (1855 – 1914), Ottoman, diplomat, historian and general
 Mehmed Selim Pasha (1771–1831), Ottoman grand vizier
 Mehmed Şükrü Pasha (1857–1916), Ottoman general 
 Mehmed Talaat Pasha (1874–1921), better known as Talaat Pasha, Ottoman grand vizier
 Mehmet Vasıf Pasha Gürcü (died 1865), Ottoman field-marshal
 Muhammad Ali of Egypt (1769–1849), also known as Mehmet Ali Pasha, Albanian Ottoman commander
 Piri Mehmed Pasha (died 1533), Ottoman grand vizier
 Rami Mehmed Pasha (1645–1704), Ottoman grand vizier and poet
 Reşid Mehmed Pasha (1780–1839), Ottoman grand vizier
 Rum Mehmed Pasha (fl. 1466–1469), Ottoman grand vizier
 Saffet Pasha (fl. 1878), Ottoman grand vizier
 Sofu Mehmed Pasha (fl. 1648–1649), Ottoman grand vizier
 Sofu Mehmed Pasha (governor) (died 1626), Ottoman governor of Egypt, Rumelia, Sivas, and Budin
 Sokollu Mehmed Pasha (1506–1579), Ottoman grand vizier
 Sokolluzade Lala Mehmed Pasha (fl. 1604–1606), Ottoman grand vizier
 Sultanzade Mehmed Pasha (died 1646), Ottoman grand vizier
 Tabanıyassı Mehmed Pasha (died 1637), Ottoman grand vizier
 Tayyar Mehmed Pasha (died 1638), Ottoman grand vizier
 Veli Mehmed Pasha (died 1716), Ottoman Kapudan Pasha and governor of Bosnia and Egypt

See also
 List of Ottoman Grand Viziers, the greatest minister of the sultan in the Ottoman Empire
 A number of Rulers of Damascus were named Mehmed Pasha
 A number of Colonial heads of Algeria were named Mehmed Pasha
 Mahmud Pasha (disambiguation)
 Mehmed (name)
 Pasha (title)